{{Infobox television
| image                = SG Susana.png
| image_size           = 250
| caption              =
| alt_name             = Hola Susana Hola Susana, te estamos llamando '
| genre                = Talk showVariety show
| creator              = 
| developer            = 
| writer               = Hugo Sofovich (sketches; 1992-2003)
| director             = 
| creative_director    = 
| presenter            = Susana Giménez
| starring             = Antonio GasallaDady BrievaMiguel del Sel
| judges               = 
| voices               = 
| narrated             = 
| theme_music_composer = 
| opentheme            = 
| endtheme             = 
| composer             = 
| country              = Argentina
| language             = Spanish
| num_seasons          = 
| num_episodes         = 3,000 (as of October 17, 2010)
| list_episodes        = 
| executive_producer   = 
| producer             = Ovidio GarcíaRaúl NayazLuis CellaGustavo GonzálezGustavo YankelevichNéstor MoyanoMarisa Badía
| editor               = 
| location             = Telefe StudiosMartínez, Buenos Aires Province
| cinematography       = 
| camera               = 
| runtime              = 
| company              = 
| distributor          = 
| channel              = ATC (1987)Canal 9 (1988-1991)Telefe (1992-present)
| picture_format       = 
| audio_format         = 
| first_aired          = 
| last_aired           = present
| preceded_by          = 
| followed_by          = 
| related              =  
}}Susana Giménez, often shortened to SG, is an Argentine television talk show that has run nationally since 1987. Owned and hosted by its namesake, Susana Giménez, it remains one of the highest-rated TV shows in Argentine television history. Due to the popularity of the show, Giménez is usually compared to Oprah Winfrey.

The TV show is one of the most successful in Latin America, and one of the few in Latin America to receive dozens of international stars from Hollywood and Europe.

Inspired by Pronto, Rafaella, hosted by Rafaella Carrá, the show was originally called Hola Susana and then Hola Susana, te estamos llamando (Hello Susana, we are calling you). It has combined interviews, sketch comedy, games and live musical performances. Giménez has received national and international stars in what is known as her "living". In 1998 the show entered Guinness World Records because of all the letters Giménez received in her show, 32 million in total. Furthermore, during the first years of the show, telephone lines collapsed.Susana Giménez is one of the longest-running television talk shows in Argentine history. The show has received 21 Martín Fierro Awards, including the Golden Martín Fierro and Platinum Martín Fierro.

 History Hola Susana debuted in Argentina Televisora Color (ATC) on April 1, 1987 at 13:00. Giménez had just finished La mujer del año, a theatrical success which, in her own words, changed her career and made her a prestigious star.

In the early years of the show, ratings were very high, with peaks from 30 to 40 points. Between 1988 and 1991, Hola Susana was broadcast on Canal 9. In 1992 it began to air on Telefe and changed its name to Hola Susana, te estamos llamando. After litigation with Ovidio García, former producer of the program, the show changed its name to Susana Giménez in 1998.

Over the years he received dozens of international stars. Some of the guests were Woody Allen, Justin Bieber, Shakira, Rod Stewart, Lenny Kravitz, Michael Bublé, Anthony Quinn, Sofia Loren, Alain Delon, Backstreet Boys, Claudia Schiffer, Naomi Campbell, Fran Drescher, Thalía, Roberto Gómez Bolaños, Viggo Mortensen, Xuxa, Brian May, Ron Wood, Ricky Martin. Christopher Reeve, Duran Duran, Alanis Morissette, Chayanne, Julio Iglesias, Wisin y Yandel, Salma Hayek, Antonio Banderas, Daddy Yankee, Paulina Rubio, Benicio del Toro, Robbie Williams, Luis Miguel, Liza Minnelli and Gloria Estefan and many others.

In the years 2002, 2006, 2012 2015 And The Current 2020-2021 Susana Giménez'' was not broadcast because Giménez needed to rest.

Awards

 2013 Martín Fierro Awards
 Best general interest

References

External links 
 
 
 

1987 Argentine television series debuts
1980s Argentine television series
1990s Argentine television series
2000s Argentine television series
2010s Argentine television series
Argentine variety television shows
Argentine television talk shows